The 2009 NORCECA Beach Volleyball Circuit at Boca Chica was held April 10–12, 2009 in Boca Chica, Dominican Republic. It was the third leg of the NORCECA Beach Volleyball Circuit 2009.

Women's competition

Men's competition

References
 Norceca
 BV Info (Archived 2009-08-01)

See also
 NORCECA Beach Volleyball Circuit 2009

Boca Chica
Beach Volleyball
International volleyball competitions hosted by the Dominican Republic